Soyuz TM-1 was an unmanned test flight of the  Soyuz-TM spacecraft, intended for use in the Mir space station program. This was the maiden flight of the Soyuz-TM spacecraft, intended as the successor to the Soyuz-T spacecraft used in the Salyut program. It docked to Mir on 23 May 1986, and undocked on the 29th. It was the last uncrewed Soyuz flight until Soyuz MS-14, in 2019.

Mission parameters
Spacecraft: Soyuz-7K-STM
Mass: 6450 kg
Crew: None
Launched: May 21, 1986
Landed: May 30, 1986

References

Further reading 
 Mir Hardware Heritage - NASA report (PDF format)
 Mir Hardware Heritage (wikisource)

Soyuz uncrewed test flights
Spacecraft launched in 1986
Spacecraft which reentered in 1986